Phra Kaeo, sometimes written as Phra Kaew, is a tambon (subdistrict) in Phachi District, the eastern part of Phra Nakhon Si Ayutthaya Province.

History & toponymy

Phra Kaeo is a canton that is the passageway of the Northern Railway Line (together with the Isan Railway Line). In the 18th century, it used to be a route back from Vientiane of the Somdet Chaophraya Maha Kasatsuek (later King Rama I)'s army. He had just finished the war and brought back the Phra Kaeo Morakot (Emerald Buddha; commonly referred to as Phra Kaeo) together. He and the Buddha image stayed overnight here before going back to Bangkok. Since then, the quarter where he rested and temporarily enshrined the Phra Kaeo Morakt, hence the name "Phra Kaeo". 

The result of the division of the new administrative area make Phra Kaeo Railway Station and Wat Phra Kaeo (the place where the Phra Kaeo Morakt was enshrined was later built as a temple) belonging to the neighbouring Krachio.

Geography
Phra Kaeo is the western part of the district. Most of the land is clay with lowlands.

Adjoining areas are (from the north clockwise) Phai Lom in its district and Ban Chung in Nakhon Luang District, Krachio in its district, with Ban Chung in Nakhon Luang District.

Administration
The entire area of Phra Kaeo is under the administration of the Subdistrict Administrative Organization (SAO) Phra Kaeo.

The seal of SAO Phra Kaeo shows Phra Kaeo Morakot in meditating posture along with the ears of rice adorned as a frame. Lower part is a handshake symbol.

The area also consists of seven administrative muban (village).

Economy
Most of the population is engaged in farming.

Places
Wat Don Klang
Wat Nong Bua
Wat Suek
Phra Kaeo Health Promotion Hospital

Products
Khao mak (Thai fermented rice)
Fish sauce
Fabric flowers

Transportation
Phra Kaeo can be reached via Highway 33 (familiarly known as Suwannasorn Road). It may also be easily accessed by Phra Kaeo Railway Station of the State Railway of Thailand (SRT), with the railways as demarcation lines only.

References

External links
 
Tambon of Phra Nakhon Si Ayutthaya Province